Dunhill Records was started in 1964 by Lou Adler, Jay Lasker, Pierre Cossette and Bobby Roberts as Dunhill Productions to release the music of Johnny Rivers on Imperial Records. It became a record label the following year and was distributed by ABC Records.

The first Dunhill single was "My Prayer/Pretty Please" (catalog #D-4001) by Shelley Fabares, who was married to Adler at the time. In the summer of 1967 Adler sold his shares to ABC Records, creating ABC-Dunhill Records, after which he started yet another label Ode Records (which was first distributed by CBS and later by A&M Records). Until 1975, ABC continued to release records on the Dunhill label, after which all remaining artists were absorbed into the ABC Records roster before MCA Records bought the label outright in 1979.

Buluu Dunhill Records was an offshoot of the ABC/Dunhill days using catalog series #B-73001 (45 RPM singles) and #B-60001 (LP).

Today, the Dunhill catalog is managed by Geffen Records.

A later independent reissue label called Dunhill Compact Classics was formed in 1986 to reissue recordings on the new CD format. British American Tobacco, a UK tobacco company, sued the company because of the use of the "Dunhill" name, forcing the company to rename itself DCC Compact Classics.

Dunhill label variations 
1965-1968—Black label with DUNHILL in white outline letters inside yellow frame
1968—Same as above, but with the "abc" logo added in front of the DUNHILL logo
1968-1969—Black label with 3-compartment multi-color box consisting of smaller DUNHILL logo (now in white letters inside white frame) in the left hand box and the white circular "abc" logo and "RECORDS" in the right hand boxes
1969-1973—Same as above, but with the multicolor "DUNHILL" and "abc RECORDS" boxes separated
1973-1974—Black label with DUNHILL spelled out in children's blocks (followed by a block with the "abc" logo) in white box (This variation only lasted a few months before the label was changed back to the multi-color box logo in which both the "one box" and "two box" variations were used)
1974-1975—Yellow, orange, red and purple label with "abc Dunhill" ("abc" circle logo in black) in between two black lines
White labels were used for most promotional issues.

Dunhill (ABC/Dunhill) Records artists 

Ranji
Steve Allen
Andwella
Attlee
Bangor Flying Circus
Birtha
Hal Blaine
Bobby Bland
The Brass Ring
Jimmy Buffett
The Bully Boys Band
Solomon Burke
Bush
Eddie Cano and His Quintet
Carmen
Cashman & West
Zach Clark
Colosseum
Danny Cox
Denny Doherty
Cass Elliot
Shelley Fabares
Mickie Finn
Four Tops
Ernie Freeman
Fresh Start
Giorgio
Gladstone
Grapefruit
The Grass Roots
Hamilton, Joe Frank & Reynolds
The Happy Day Choir
Richard Harris
Roy Head
Headstone
The Hello People
Thelma Houston
Jamme
John Kay
Thomas Jefferson Kaye
Andy Kim
B. B. King & Bobby Bland
The Artie Kornfeld Tree
Kracker
Dennis Lambert
The Lamp of Childhood
Richard Landis
Locomotiv GT
Magna Carta
The Mamas & the Papas
Kenneth Mars
Tony Martin
Gayle McCormick
Barry McGuire
Mighty Clouds of Joy
Mrs. Miller
Daniel Moore
Murphy's Law
Lady Nelson and the Lords
Noah
Michael Omartian
Pacific Gas & Electric
Freda Payne
John Phillips
Pratt & McClain
Jim Price
Pure Love & Pleasure
Genya Ravan
Rejoice!
Rincon Surfside Band
Emitt Rhodes
The Road Home
The Rock & Roll Revival
William St. James
Shango
Del Shannon
P. F. Sloan
Smith
Sonoma (band)
Dusty Springfield
The Stapleton-Morley Expression
Steppenwolf
Alex Taylor
Three Dog Night
Three's a Crowd
Tribe
The Trousdale Strings and the Dawn Chorale
Van der Graaf Generator
The John Verity Band
Bengt Arne Wallin
Joe Walsh
Bobby Whitlock
Wings (1968 band)
Charles Wright

References

External links 
 The Dunhill Records Story
 Profile of Dunhill Records at Discogs

American record labels
Pop record labels
Record labels based in California
Defunct record labels of the United States
Record labels established in 1964
Record labels disestablished in 1975
1975 disestablishments in California